The current national flag of Lesotho, adopted on the 40th anniversary of Lesotho's independence on 4 October 2006, features a horizontal blue, white, and green tricolour with a black mokorotlo (a Basotho hat) in the center. The design is intended to reflect a state that is both at peace internally and with its only neighbour South Africa, replacing the old flag design that featured a military emblem of a shield, spear and knobkerrie.

Colours 
The symbolism of the colours is:

Construction Sheet

History

1966–1987

The first flag of Lesotho was introduced on 4 October 1966, the day of Lesotho's full independence from the United Kingdom. It featured a prominent white mokorotlo.  The blue stood for sky and rain, the white for peace, the green for land, and the red for faith.

1987–2006

A new flag, designed by Sergeant Retšelisitsoe Matete, was adopted on 20 January 1987, following a military coup which ousted the Basotho National Party after 20 years in power. A light brown traditional Basotho shield along with an assegai (lance) and knobkierrie (club) replaced the mokorotlo as the primary emblem.  The colour scheme and pattern changed as well, with a triangular white field standing for peace.  The bottom diagonal contained a blue strip for rain and a green triangle for prosperity.

2006–present
In 2006, a new flag was chosen from four proposed designs; all of these designs included a brown Basotho hat instead of the shield. This was subsequently changed to a black Basotho hat in order to represent Lesotho as a black nation. The bill changing the flag was approved by the National Assembly on 18 September 2006, with 84 members of parliament voting in favour of it, 18 against it, and two abstaining. It was subsequently approved by the Senate as well.

Gallery

Historical flags

See also
Coat of arms of Lesotho

References

External links

Lesoto
Lesoto
Lesoto
Flags of Africa
Flag
Lesotho
Lesotho